Sobhan (1968 – 6 January 2008) was an Indian film director and screenwriter who has worked in Telugu films. He was best known for his work in the film Varsham (2004).

Career
Sobhan went to Chennai in 1989 to join the film industry. He initially worked for a film called Rowdyism, which was stalled after 10 days of shooting. He then joined Tripuraneni Varaprasad alias Chitti Babu as co director for Raithu Bharatham, He then joined Ram Gopal Varma as a co-director for Anaganaga Oka Roju. Later, he started his profession as a writer for Krishna Vamsi's film Sindhooram and worked with him for Murari, and also acted in films like Kshana Kshanam and  Oka Raju Oka Rani. Later, he directed a few episodes of Malayalam TV serial Navaneetha (2000). During the making of Murari, he was in touch with Mahesh Babu, and that led to the film Bobby. Sobhan was known for his able hand in scripting. He helped many directors during the script sessions of many super hit films.

Death
Sobhan died on 6 January 2008, from cardiac arrest, at the age of 40. He was in the middle of narrating a story to Bhumika Chawla, when he complained of chest pain and collapsed. She and her husband, Bharath Thakur, immediately rushed him to Image Hospitals in Madhapur. The doctors declared that he was brought dead. He is survived by his wife, Soujanya, and two sons, including actor Santosh Shoban. His elder brother, comedian Lakshmipati, died that same year.

Filmography
As director
 Bobby (2002)
 Varsham (2004)
 Chanti (2004)

As actor
 Oka Raju Oka Rani (2003)

As dialogue writer
 Murari (2001)

References

External links 

 

21st-century Indian film directors
Telugu film directors
2008 deaths
1968 births
Date of birth missing
Place of birth missing
Indian film directors
Indian screenwriters
Telugu screenwriters
21st-century Indian screenwriters
Telugu male actors
Indian male actors
21st-century Indian actors
Male actors in Telugu cinema